Commendation ceremony was a formal ceremony that evolved during the Early Medieval period to create a bond between a lord and his fighting man.

Commendation may also refer to:
 the placing of an ecclesiastical benefice in commendam
 Ulmus 'Morton Stalwart' Commendation, a Morton Arboretum hybrid cultivar
 Commander-in-Chief Unit Commendation, a Canadian award given to military units
 Commendation Medal, a mid-level United States military decoration
 Commendation for Gallantry, a military decoration awarded to personnel of the Australian Defence Force
 King's Commendation, a South African award for valuable services in connection with the Second World War
 Meritorious Team Commendation, a unit award of the United States Coast Guard
 Meritorious Unit Commendation, a mid-level unit award of the United States Armed Forces
 Navy Unit Commendation, a United States Navy unit award

Official Commendation awards of the United Kingdom consist of:
 King's and Queen's Commendation for Brave Conduct, awarded 1939-1994
 King's and Queen's Commendation for Valuable Service in the Air, awarded 1942-1994
 Queen's Commendation for Bravery, awarded since 1994
 Queen's Commendation for Bravery in the Air, awarded since 1994
 Queen's Commendation for Valuable Service, awarded since 1994

See also 
 Condemnation (disambiguation)